ABS-CBN Corporation is a Filipino media company based in Quezon City, Metro Manila, Philippines. It is the largest entertainment and media conglomerate in the Philippines. It is a subsidiary of Lopez Holdings Corporation which is owned by the López family ABS-CBN was formed by the merger of Alto Broadcasting System (ABS) and Chronicle Broadcasting Network (CBN).

ABS was founded in 1946 by American electronics engineer James Lindenberg as Bolinao Electronics Corporation (BEC). In 1952, BEC was renamed Alto Broadcasting System (ABS) with its corporate name, Alto Sales Corporation after Judge Antonio Quirino, brother of President Elpidio Quirino, purchased the company and later launched the first TV station in the country, DZAQ-TV on October 23, 1953. The company that would later be merged with ABS to form ABS-CBN was founded in 1956 as Chronicle Broadcasting Network, Inc. (CBN) by Eugenio Lopez Sr. and his brother Fernando Lopez, who was the sitting Vice President of the Philippines. A year later, the Lopezes acquired ABS. The ABS-CBN brand was first used on television in 1961. The company became known as ABS-CBN Broadcasting Corporation on February 1, 1967. The conglomerate started to adapt the ABS-CBN Corporation name on May 27, 2010, to reflect the company's diversification, although the ABS-CBN Broadcasting Corporation name is still used alternatively on some uses. The common shares of ABS-CBN were first traded on the Philippine Stock Exchange in July 1992 under the ticker symbol ABS.

The conglomerate mainly focus as a content company, which includes producing television programs, films and other entertainment contents and distributions.

History

The company was founded on June 13, 1946, as Bolinao Electronics Corporation (BEC). BEC was established by James Lindenberg, one of the founding fathers of Philippine television, an American electronics engineer who went into radio equipment assembly and radio broadcasting. At that time, the largest media company was Manila Broadcasting Company (MBC), with DZRH as the leading radio station. In 1949, James Lindenberg shifted Bolinao to radio broadcasting with DZBC and masterminded the introduction of television to the country in 1953.

In 1951, Lindenberg partnered with Antonio Quirino, brother of then-Philippine President Elpidio Quirino, in order to try their hand at television broadcasting. In 1952, BEC was renamed as Alto Broadcasting System or ABS (with Alto Sales Corporation as its corporate name). "Alto" was a contraction of Quirino's and his wife's first names, Tony and Aleli. Though they had little money and resources, ABS was able to put up its TV tower by July 1953 and import some 300 television sets. The initial test broadcasts began in September of the same year. The very first full-blown broadcast was on October 23, 1953, of a party in Tony Quirino's humble abode. The television station was known as DZAQ-TV.

On June 16, 1955, Republic Act No. 1343 signed by President Ramon Magsaysay granted the Manila Chronicle its broadcasting franchise, leading to the formation of the Chronicle Broadcasting Network.

The Chronicle Broadcasting Network (CBN) was founded on September 24, 1956, by Eugenio Lopez Sr. and the then-Philippine Vice President Fernando Lopez. The network initially focused only on radio broadcasting. It launched its very own TV station, DZXL-TV 9, on April 19 (or July), 1958. On February 24, 1957, Don Eugenio acquired ABS from Quirino and Lindenberg. A month later, Don Eugenio also acquired Monserrat Broadcasting System. 

In 1958, the network's new headquarters at Dewey Boulevard were inaugurated, and all radio and television operations were consolidated into its two buildings – the radio stations at the Chronicle Building at Aduana Street, Intramuros, Manila and the TV operations at the brand new Dewey Boulevard building in Pasay, Rizal.

The ABS-CBN brand was first used in 1961. However, it was only on February 1, 1967, that the corporate name was changed to ABS-CBN Broadcasting Corporation. Before it was named ABS-CBN Broadcasting Corporation, the corporate name was Bolinao Electronics Corporation (BEC).

YouTube hacking incident 
On November 3, 2020, the YouTube channels of ABS-CBN News and ANC 24/7 were terminated for several hours, allegedly due to a “violation of YouTube’s Terms of Service.” It is unclear what the violation was, however, it was later confirmed by YouTube that the channels were targeted by hackers instead. Both channels were reinstated on the same day, at around at 3:58 P.M (PHT).

Assets and subsidiaries

ABS-CBN Corporation owns major of media and entertainment companies in the Philippines, and offers services and products such as television and radio broadcast, satellite and cable, broadcast syndication, telecommunications, publishing, content production and program and film distributor, television production, film production, new media and digital platforms, talent agencies, pay TV and broadband internet provider, consumer sales and merchandise, music label and recording, and theater. The group owns and operates Kapamilya Channel and ABS-CBN News Channel under ABS-CBN as well as the Teleradyo and MOR Entertainment digital radio networks. The Kapamilya Channel, in particular, is the largest contributor to the group's revenue mainly from selling airtime to advertisers. The remaining revenue is generated from block-timing with A2Z and TV5 as well as from consumer sales, mainly from ABS-CBN Global Ltd. and ABS-CBN International, which distributes international television channels such as TFC HD, ANC Global, Cinema One Global, Cine Mo! Global, Teleradyo Global and Myx Global and also from pay TV and broadband internet provider Sky Cable Corporation.

Other companies which operate under the ABS-CBN group are motion picture companies under ABS-CBN Film Productions, such as Star Cinema, Cinema One Originals, Cine Bro and Black Sheep Productions, television production companies ABS-CBN Entertainment, Dreamscape Entertainment, Star Creatives, RCD Narratives, JRB Creative Production and RGE Drama Unit under RSB Scripted Format, entertainment and film production Star Magic Studio (under Star Magic), online ticketing and streaming site KTX, they also operate music recording labels under ABS-CBN Music, such as Star Music and its subsidiaries, Tarsier Records, and MYX Global, publishing firm ABS-CBN Publishing and ABS-CBN Books, pay TV content provider and distributor Creative Programs, telecommunications company ABS-CBN Convergence which owned by the company with 68% co-owned with Globe Telecom, and talent agencies Star Magic, its divisions such as Star Hunt, Polaris, and Rise Artists Studio. They also operate the main entertainment and production division of ABS-CBN, Star Creatives Group. Among the pay TV networks and channels under the ABS-CBN group are ANC, Cinema One, Cine Mo!, Jeepney TV, Kapamilya Channel, Knowledge Channel, Metro Channel, Myx and TeleRadyo. In recent years, ABS-CBN has ventured and diversified in other businesses such as over-the-top platform iWant TFC, TFC IPTV and web-based channel Kapamilya Online Live. Both iWant TFC and Kapamilya Online Live are under ABS-CBN Digital Media, a new media and digital division under ABS-CBN which also handles news.ABS-CBN.com and ABS-CBN.com. ABS-CBN is also the principal owner of the ABS-CBN Philharmonic Orchestra. It also owns ABS-CBN Studios, Inc. which operates its production facilities nationwide, including the ABS-CBN Soundstage located in Bulacan and Regional production facilities. And the newly relaunched theater arm of ABS-CBN, Teatro Kapamilya. Aside from the ABS-CBN Soundstage, ABS-CBN also has other real estate properties for the company's operations.

Notes

References

Further reading
 John A. Lent (1971). Philippine Mass Communication Before 1811 and After 1966. Manila: Philippine Press Institute. 
 John A. Lent (1978). Broadcasting in Asia and the Pacific: A Continental Survey of Radio and Television. Philadelphia: Temple University. 
 Kapisanan ng mga Brodkaster sa Pilipinas: The 1996 KBP Media Factbook. Makati: Kapisanan ng mga Brodkaster ng Pilipinas. 1996
 Cecille Matutina (1999). Pinoy Television: The Story of ABS-CBN. Quezon City: Benpres Publishing, Inc. 
 Raul S. De Vera (2000). Philippine Studies Vol. 48, No. 2. Manila: Ateneo de Manila University
 Philip Kitley (2003). Television, Regulation and Civil Society in Asia. London: Routledge. 
 Michael Keane (2003). Television Across Asia: TV Industries, Programme Formats and Globalisation. London: Routledge. 
 Raul Rodrigo (2006). Kapitan: Geny Lopez and the Making of ABS-CBN. Quezon City: ABS-CBN Publishing, Inc. 
 Jonathan Woodier (2009). The Media and Political Change in Southeast Asia: Karaoke Culture and the Evolution of Personality Politics. Cheltenham: Edward Elgar Publishing. 
 Horace Newcomb (2014). Encyclopedia of Television 4 Vol Set. London: Routledge. 
 Jinna Tay, Graeme Turner, Koichi Iwabuchi (November 30, 2014). Television Histories in Asia: Issues and Contexts. London: Routledge. 
 Jonathan Corpus Ong (May 15, 2015). The Poverty of Television: The Mediation of Suffering in Class-Divided Philippines. Anthem Press. 
 Ella G. Mangabat (October 17, 2003). "Years of service to the Filipino: The ABS-CBN story". Philippine Daily Inquirer
 James Hookway (June 23, 2004). "Filipino Broadcaster ABS-CBN Finds Growing Audience Overseas". The Wall Street Journal
 David Englander (October 15, 2014). "ABS-CBN: Philippine Broadcaster Sends Strong Buy Signal - Shares of the Philippines’ largest TV broadcaster can rise near 50% as the country continues its rapid growth." Barron's
 David Englander (March 11, 2015). "ABS-CBN: Philippine Broadcaster Can Rise 25% - Philippines’ largest TV broadcaster has surged since we recommended shares last year. Stay long." Barron's
 Mark Yu (August 26, 2016). "ABS-CBN May Be Worth Your Investment - The Philippine media broadcasting leader offers some value". GuruFocus.com
 Media Ownership Monitor Philippines - Media Companies: A Duopoly Rules by VERA Files and Reporters Without Borders

External links

 

 
Conglomerate companies of the Philippines
Entertainment companies of the Philippines
Broadcasting companies of the Philippines
Mass media companies of the Philippines
Mass media in Metro Manila
Entertainment companies established in 1946
Mass media companies established in 1946
1946 establishments in the Philippines
1967 mergers and acquisitions
Companies based in Quezon City
Companies listed on the Philippine Stock Exchange
Wikipedia articles needing factual verification from November 2015